Brecht Verbrugghe (born 29 April 1982, in Roeselare) is a Belgium football midfielder who currently plays for KV Kortrijk. He joined to S.V. Zulte Waregem in 2002, he came from K.A.A. Gent.

References

1982 births
Living people
Belgian footballers
Belgian Pro League players
K.V. Kortrijk players
Association football midfielders
People from Roeselare
Footballers from West Flanders